Socialist Workers Youth of Saarland (abbreviated 'SAJ') was a socialist youth movement in the Saar. SAJ was founded on October 26, 1952, at the restaurant of the Saar Landtag in Saarbrücken. The founding of SAJ had been preceded by the break between the Socialist Youth League (BSJ) and the Saar Social Democratic Party (SPS). SAJ was launched as the new SPS youth wing.

SAJ had around 2,500 members. Erich Ladwein was the chairman of the organization. The organization issued two publications, Jugend und Welt (weekly) and Gruppenabend (monthly). It was a member of the International Union of Socialist Youth (alongside the BSJ).

References

Youth wings of social democratic parties
Politics of Saarland
1952 establishments in Saar
Youth organizations established in 1952